Sheikh Morteza Ansari is a NODET (National Organization for Development of Exceptional Talents, also known as SAMPAD) School for talented or gifted students in Dezful. It was established in 1990 under management of Mr. Tayebtaher, and now it's managed by Mr.Kalanpour.

In 2018/19, the school achieved great success across the country that including:
 First place in the 21st Khwarizmi National Festival
 The best Dezful student In the national entrance exam graduated from high school
 The total number of those admitted to the national entrance exam were 60 students the Second High School in the Province in number of Accepted students
 100% of mathematics students admitted to the university first high school in province in number of accepted mathematics students
 Admission of 15 students in the medical dentistry and pharmacy Second High School in the Province in number of Accepted Experimental Sciences students
 Mohammad Haddadinejad 5th student in Mathematical Rank in Region graduated in sheikh ansari high school

See also 
 Education in Iran

References

External links
 
address of sheikh ansari high school in google maps
 Sampadia's (nodet students) Official Website
 National Organization for Development of Exceptional Talents

Schools in Iran
Dezful County
Educational institutions established in 1990
1990 establishments in Iran